Bahnwärter Thiel may refer to:

 Bahnwärter Thiel (novella), a Naturalist novella by Gerhart Hauptmann
 Bahnwärter Thiel (club), a club in Munich, Germany